La Haye is a commune in the department of Manche, northwestern France. The municipality was established on 1 January 2016 by merger of the former communes of La Haye-du-Puits (the seat), Baudreville, Bolleville, Glatigny, Mobecq, Montgardon, Saint-Rémy-des-Landes, Saint-Symphorien-le-Valois and Surville.

See also 
Communes of the Manche department

References 

Communes of Manche
Populated places established in 2016
2016 establishments in France